Baron Leighton of St Mellons, of St Mellons in the County of Monmouth, is a title in the Peerage of the United Kingdom. It was created on 25 January 1962 for the Welsh shipping magnate Sir Leighton Seager, 1st Baronet. He was the son of Sir William Henry Seager. Seager had already been created a Baronet, of St Mellons in the County of Monmouth on 1 July 1952.  the titles are held by his grandson, the third Baron, who succeeded his father in 1998. As of 31 December 2016 the present Baronet has not successfully proven his succession and is therefore not on the Official Roll of the Baronetage, with the baronetcy considered dormant since 1998.

Barons Leighton of St Mellons (1962)

(George) Leighton Seager, 1st Baron Leighton of St Mellons (1896–1963)
John Leighton Seager, 2nd Baron Leighton of St Mellons (1922–1998)
Robert William Henry Leighton Seager, 3rd Baron Leighton of St Mellons (b. 1955)

The heir presumptive and last in line is the present holder's only brother the Hon. Simon John Leighton Seager (b. 1957).

Notes

References
Kidd, Charles, Williamson, David (editors). Debrett's Peerage and Baronetage (1990 edition). New York: St Martin's Press, 1990, 

Baronies in the Peerage of the United Kingdom
Noble titles created in 1962